Karim Bencherifa (born 15 February 1968) is a former Moroccan football player and head coach, who currently manages Botola 2  side IZK Khemisset. Bencherifa has been a head coach in six countries which include his home nation Morocco, as well as clubs in Malta, Brunei, Singapore, India, and most recently Guinea. He received some of his training in Leipzig

Coaching career
After a few months of coaching Singaporean side Warriors FC he took a break from coaching due to personal reasons. In 2017, he joined the Morocco U23 national team as assistant coach from 2017 to 2019. In 2020, he spent a few months coaching Botola team Mouloudia Oujda as an assistant coach.
In December of 2020 Hafia FC announced the signing of Karim Bencherifa on a three year deal.

I-League coaching record
.

Honours

As manager
Salgaocar
 I-League: 2010–11
 Federation Cup: 2011
Mohun Bagan
 Calcutta Football League: 2007–08

Individual
 FPAI Syed Abdul Rahim Award: 2010–11

References

External links
 Karim Bencherifa Interview

1968 births
Living people
Moroccan footballers
Moroccan football managers
Footballers from Rabat
I-League managers
Pune FC managers
Mohun Bagan AC managers
Salgaocar FC managers
Churchill Brothers FC Goa managers
Moroccan expatriates in India
Expatriate football managers in India
Moroccan expatriates in Singapore
Expatriate football managers in Singapore
Expatriate football managers in Brunei
Brunei national football team managers
Singapore Premier League head coaches
Woodlands Wellington FC head coaches
Tanjong Pagar United FC head coaches
Warriors FC head coaches
Association footballers not categorized by position